Edward J. Anderson (23 October 1859 – 21 December 1923) was an American politician.

Anderson was born in Powhatan County, Virginia, on 23 October 1859. He later moved to Waxahachie, Texas, and represented District 39 in the Texas House of Representatives from 1909 to 1911 as a Democrat. Anderson died in Waxahachie on 21 December 1923.

References

People from Powhatan County, Virginia
1859 births
1923 deaths
People from Waxahachie, Texas
20th-century American politicians
Democratic Party members of the Texas House of Representatives